This is a list of TV series that were made and shown in the Soviet Union and Russia. It does not include foreign-made imports.

1960s

1970s

Footnotes

References

1980s

1990s

2000s

2010s

Lists of television series by country of production
Television series